Eduardo António da Silva Henriques (born 24 March 1968 in Alenquer, Oeste) is a Portuguese runner who specialized in the 3000 metres steeplechase and cross-country running. Since 1999 he has mainly been running half marathon.

Achievements

Personal bests
1500 metres - 3:38.82 min (1992)
3000 metres - 7:51.00 min (1993)
3000 metres steeplechase - 8:27.53 min (1996)
5000 metres - 13:26.91 min (1998)
10,000 metres - 28:05.09 min (2003)
Half marathon - 1:01:41 hrs (2006)

External links

The World Cross Country Championships 1973-2005

1968 births
Living people
People from Alenquer
Portuguese male long-distance runners
Athletes (track and field) at the 1996 Summer Olympics
Olympic athletes of Portugal
Portuguese male steeplechase runners
Sportspeople from Lisbon District